The Roman Catholic Diocese of Marsabit is a diocese located in the city of Marsabit in the Ecclesiastical province of Nyeri in Kenya.

History
 November 25, 1964: Established as Diocese of Marsabit from Diocese of Nyeri

Leadership
 Bishops of Marsabit (Roman rite)
 Bishop Carlo Maria Cavallera, I.M.C. (25 Nov 1964 – 1981)
 Bishop Ambrogio Ravasi, I.M.C. (19 Jun 1981  – 25 Nov 2006)
 Bishop Peter Kihara Kariuki, I.M.C. (since 25 Nov 2006)

See also
Roman Catholicism in Kenya

Sources
 GCatholic.org
 Catholic Hierarchy

Marsabit County
Roman Catholic dioceses in Kenya
Christian organizations established in 1964
Roman Catholic dioceses and prelatures established in the 20th century
Roman Catholic Ecclesiastical Province of Nyeri